Hivehchi-ye Bala (also Romanized as Hīvehchī-e Bālā; also known as Hīvehchī) is a village in Bagheli-ye Marama Rural District, in the Central District of Gonbad-e Qabus County, Golestan Province, Iran. At the 2006 census, its population was 2,076, in 455 families.

References 

Populated places in Gonbad-e Kavus County